The Caproni Vizzola C22 Ventura was a light jet-powered aircraft developed in Italy for use as a military trainer. It was of conventional sailplane configuration and bore a family resemblance to the Caproni Calif gliders, although the Ventura had an almost entirely metal structure. The student and instructor sat side by side under an expansive canopy, and weapons hardpoints were provided under each of the slender, high-mounted wings. It had retractable, tricycle undercarriage.

In 1981, Agusta acquired 50% of the C22 programme and proposed a new version, the C22R, which was to have been a reconnaissance aircraft also capable of Forward Air Control and ELINT operations. The basic C22J trainer was exhibited at the Farnborough Air Show in 1980 and September 1982, but failed to attract any customers, and the proposed C22R was never actually built.

Specifications (C22J)

References

 
 
 
 

Vizzola Ventura
C22R
1980s Italian military trainer aircraft
Twinjets
High-wing aircraft
Aircraft first flown in 1980
T-tail aircraft